Daxing is a town under the administration of Linshu County, Shandong, China. , it has one residential community and 25 villages under its administration.

References 

Township-level divisions of Shandong
Linshu County